Cape Northumberland is a headland in the southeast of the Australian state of South Australia. It is the southernmost point of South Australia.

History 
Cape Northumberland was named by the Royal Navy officer, James Grant, on 3 December 1800, when he was mapping the southern coast of Australia in his early-19th century expedition. The headland was named after Hugh Percy, Duke of Northumberland. The cape is near the site of the historic Cape Northumberland Lighthouse, built in 1887.

Geography 

The cape is located on the southeast coast of South Australia. It is the western end of Discovery Bay and its subsidiary, MacDonnell Bay. It is the southernmost point on the South Australian coastline.

Climate

Gallery

References

N
N